The variable shrikethrush (Colluricincla fortis) is a species of bird in the family Pachycephalidae.

Taxonomy and systematics
This species was formerly considered a conspecific member of the little shrikethrush complex. Genetic investigations of New Guinea populations of the little shrikethrush indicate high levels of genetic divergence, suggesting it comprised more than one species.

Subspecies
Currently, three subspecies are recognized:
 C. f. despecta - (Rothschild & Hartert, 1903): Found on southern coast of south-eastern New Guinea
 C. f. fortis - (Gadow, 1883): Originally described as a separate species in the genus Pachycephala. Found on D'Entrecasteaux Archipelago (off southeastern New Guinea)
 C. f. trobriandi - (Hartert, 1896): Found on Trobriand Islands

Distribution and habitat
It is found in New Guinea. Its natural habitats are subtropical or tropical moist lowland forests and subtropical or tropical moist montane forests.

References

Variable shrikethrush
Birds of New Guinea
Variable shrikethrush
Variable shrikethrush